W. David King  (born December 22, 1947) is a Canadian hockey coach who has been head coach in the National Hockey League (NHL), the Russian Super League, Kontinental Hockey League, Western Hockey League, the Winter Olympics, and the IIHF World Junior Championships.  He was born in North Battleford, Saskatchewan.

Early life
King was born in North Battleford, Saskatchewan.

Amateur coaching career
King's first coaching job was as an assistant coach with the University of Saskatchewan in the 1972–73 season. He later coached the Billings Bighorns of the Western Hockey League and returned to Saskatchewan, winning three conference championships and being named 1980 Canadian Interuniversity Athletics Union coach of the year. He led the Saskatchewan Huskies to the CIAU national title in 1983.

Professional coaching career
King was hired by the Calgary Flames of the NHL in 1992 and coached there until 1995. He was assistant coach with the Montreal Canadiens from 1997 to 1999 and then became the first coach of the expansion Columbus Blue Jackets in their inaugural 2000–01 season until his firing on January 7, 2003, in the middle of the 2002–03 season.

Outside of the NHL, King coached the Hamburg Freezers of the Deutsche Eishockey Liga from 2003 until March 2005, Metallurg Magnitogorsk of the Russian Super League and in 2006, was the head coach of the Swedish team Malmö Redhawks of the Swedish Elite League. Based on his experiences in Russia, King co-authored a book with sports journalist Eric Duhatschek. Titled King of Russia: A Year in the Russian Super League, the book was released in October 2007.

On December 22, 2007, King became the head coach of the Adler Mannheim of the Deutsche Eishockey Liga (DEL).

On September 21, 2009 the Phoenix Coyotes hired Dave King as an assistant coach. At the end of the 2010-11 NHL season, King stepped down as assistant coach. He was then moved to the position of Development Coach with the Coyotes. In his duties as Development Coach King, "oversee[s] all pro player development including working with coaches and players in Portland (of the American Hockey League) during the season. In addition, he... help[s] with special assignment scouting and assist the coaching staff in Phoenix when his schedule permits."

In 2013-14 and in 2014-15, he was hired by Lokomotiv Yaroslavl of the Kontinental Hockey League to replace Pyotr Vorobyov and Sean Simpson as head coach respectively.

International coaching career
King was the head coach of Canada's national junior team, and helped guide the team to a gold medal at the 1982 IIHF world junior championships and a bronze medal at the 1983 world junior championships. He was head coach of the Canadian national team at the 1984, 1988, and 1992 Winter Olympics, finishing fourth in 1984 and 1988, and winning a silver medal in 1992. He also coached the Canadian national team at five IIHF world championships. In 1987 he coached Canada to the gold medal in the Izvestia Cup tournament in Moscow, becoming the first Canadian team to defeat the Soviet national team in the USSR since the 1972 Summit Series.

King served as head coach for Team Canada during the 2016 Deutschland Cup and as associate coach helped win the 2016 Spengler Cup.

King spoke at the Open Ice Summit in 1999, and advocated for more time to practice skills compared to playing time. He compared the Canadian system which looked for physical size first and introduced body contact at a young age, where as the European system looked for skills first, practiced three times as much as the Canadian model, and did not have body contact in youth hockey.

On July 25, 2017 he was named an assistant coach of Canada's men's team for the 2018 Winter Olympics in Pyeongchang, Korea. In December 2017, he again served as associate coach of Team Canada at the Spengler Cup in Davos, capturing another title.

He was made a Member of the Order of Canada in 1992, was inducted into the Canadian Olympic Hall of Fame in 1997 and the IIHF Hall of Fame in 2001. In recognition of his contributions to the game with the national teams, Hockey Canada named him to the Order of Hockey in Canada as part of its 2013 class.

NHL head coach record

References

External links
Dave King profile at EliteProspects.com

1947 births
Arizona Coyotes coaches
Arizona Coyotes personnel
Billings Bighorns coaches
Calgary Flames coaches
Canada men's national ice hockey team coaches
Columbus Blue Jackets coaches
Ice hockey people from Saskatchewan
IIHF Hall of Fame inductees
Living people
Members of the Order of Canada
Montreal Canadiens coaches
Montreal Canadiens scouts
Order of Hockey in Canada recipients
Sportspeople from North Battleford
University of Saskatchewan alumni